Kumar Suvarana Chandrak or the Kumar Gold Medal is a literary award given by Kumar Trust, Ahmedabad, India since 1944. The medal is annually conferred to a Gujarati author for his contribution in Kumar magazine published by Kumar Trust. In 1950, Chandravadan Mehta refused to accept Kumar Chandrak.

History 
The medal was established in 1944, by Yashwant Pandya, an author contributing to Kumar. Initially, Gujarati authors Balwantray Thakore, Vishnuprasad Trivedi and Sundaram had served in a committee for the selection of awardee. Subsequently Ramnarayan V. Pathak and Anantrai Raval served on the committee. From 1983 to 2002, there is no expressed declaration of this medal, but from 2003 it has been started again. It was renamed from Kumar Chandrak (Kumar Medal) to Kumar Suvarna Chandrak (Kumar Gold Medal) in 2003.

Recipients

References 

Awards established in 1944
1944 establishments in India
Gujarati literary awards